Hedmark County Municipality was the regional governing administration of the old Hedmark county in Norway. The county municipality was established in its most recent form on 1 January 1976 when the law was changed to allow elected county councils in Norway. The county municipality was dissolved on 1 January 2020, when Hedmark was merged with the neighboring Oppland county, creating the new Innlandet county which is led by the Innlandet County Municipality. The administrative seat is located in Hamar and the county mayor was Dag Rønning of the Centre Party.

The main responsibilities of the county municipality included the running of all of the upper secondary schools. It managed all the county roadways, public transport, dental care, culture, and cultural heritage sites in the county. Public transport was managed through Hedmark Trafikk.

County government
The Hedmark county council was made up of 33 representatives that were elected every four years. The council essentially acted as a Parliament or legislative body for the county and it met several times each year. The council was divided into standing committees and an executive board which met considerably more often. Both the council and executive board were led by the County Mayor who held the executive powers of the county. The final County Mayor was Dag Rønning.

County council
The party breakdown of the council is as follows:

References

 
County municipality
County municipalities of Norway
Organisations based in Hamar
1838 establishments in Norway
2020 disestablishments in Norway